Manuel Benson Hedilazio (born 28 March 1997) is a Belgian professional footballer who plays as a winger for Burnley.

His father, Jorge Hedilazio, is a former Angolan footballer who played for Lokeren in the 1990s.

Early life 
Benson was born in Lokeren to an Angolan father, Jorge Hedilazio, and a Belgian mother, Gina Pieters. His parents met in the 1990s at Bobby's Club, a dance bar in Lokeren, while his father was playing for the local club.

Club career 
Benson made his top flight debut, playing for Lierse, on 19 April 2014 against KV Oostende in a 2–0 home defeat. He replaced Ahmed Sayed after 87 minutes. In the 2016–17 season he played 37 league games for Lierse, scoring 7 goals, four of which in 9 Europa League play-offs games. In this season Benson also tied with Kevin Kis for the league's top assist provider.

In 2017, he moved to RC Genk, and was loaned out to Royal Excel Mouscron for the 2018–19 season. He played a total of 28 games for Mouscron, scoring 6 goals. Benson had the most assists in the regular season behind Hans Vanaken and Alejandro Pozuelo with 8.

In September 2019, he moved to Royal Antwerp FC on a permanent move.

In the 2020–21 season, Benson played five games in the Belgian First Division A and 3 games in the UEFA Europa League, scoring one goal in Antwerp's 3–1 win over Ludogorets, which allowed them to advance to the Round of 32. On 26 January 2021, Benson moved to Eredivisie club PEC Zwolle on a loan deal until the end of the season. He had the most assists of his team in the 2020–21 Eredivisie, recording four assists in 13 league games.

On 4 August 2022, Benson joined EFL Championship club Burnley for an undisclosed fee on a four-year deal. He scored his first goal for Burnley in a 2–1 win against Bristol City on 17 September 2022. He scored his first FA Cup goals on 7 January, 2023, notching a pair in an away game against Bournemouth.

Career statistics

Club

Honours
Genk
 Belgian Super Cup: 2019

Antwerp
 Belgian Cup: 2019–20

Individual
 Belgian Second Division top assist provider: 2016–17 (joint – 7 assists)

References

External links

1997 births
Living people
People from Lokeren
Footballers from East Flanders
Black Belgian sportspeople
Belgian people of Angolan descent
Association football wingers
Belgian footballers
Belgium under-21 international footballers
Belgium youth international footballers
Belgian Pro League players
Challenger Pro League players
Eredivisie players
English Football League players
Lierse S.K. players
K.R.C. Genk players
Royal Excel Mouscron players
Royal Antwerp F.C. players
PEC Zwolle players
Burnley F.C. players
Belgian expatriate footballers
Belgian expatriate sportspeople in the Netherlands
Expatriate footballers in the Netherlands
Belgian expatriate sportspeople in England
Expatriate footballers in England